Banksia cirsioides is a species of shrub that is endemic to Western Australia. It has pinnatisect leaves with between six and ten lobes on each side and hairy heads of yellow and pink flowers.

Description
Banksia cirsiodes is a rounded or column-like shrub that typically grows to a height of  but does not form a lignotuber. Each side of the leaves has between six and ten linear to lance-shaped, sharply pointed lobes on each side.

Taxonomy and naming
This species was first formally described in 1856 by Carl Meissner who gave it the name Dryandra cirsioides and published the description in de Candolle's Prodromus Systematis Naturalis Regni Vegetabilis from specimens collected by James Drummond. The specific epithet (carlinoides) is a reference to a perceived similarity to plants in the genus Cirsium. In 2007 Austin Mast and Kevin Thiele transferred all dryandras to the genus Banksia.

Distribution and habitat
Banksia cirsioides grows in kwongan between the Stirling Range and Munglinup in the Avon Wheatbelt, Coolgardie, Esperance Plains and Mallee biogeographic regions

References

Further reading
 

cirsioides
Plants described in 1856
Endemic flora of Western Australia
Eudicots of Western Australia
Taxa named by Kevin Thiele